The Adventure of a Ball Night is a 1918 German silent adventure film directed by Viggo Larsen and starring Gertrude Welcker, Paul Bildt, and Paul Biensfeldt.

The film's sets were designed by the art director Willy Helwig.

Cast
 Gertrude Welcker as Baronesse Blanca von Walheim
 Viggo Larsen as Graf von Lahnsdorff
 Paul Bildt as Hans Freiherr von Badewitz
 Paul Biensfeldt as Der schwarze Max

References

Bibliography

External links

1918 films
Films of the German Empire
German silent feature films
Films directed by Viggo Larsen
German adventure films
1918 adventure films
UFA GmbH films
German black-and-white films
Silent adventure films
1910s German films
1910s English-language films